Charles Craig (August 13, 1877 – May, 1972) was an American actor. He appeared in 120 films between 1909 and 1931.

Selected filmography
To Save Her Soul (1909)
The Woman from Mellon's (1910)
The Lucky Toothache (1910)
Winning Back His Love (1910)
The Woman in White (1912)
Where Love Leads (1916)
The Poor Little Rich Girl (1917)
A Royal Romance (1917)
The Fall of the Romanoffs (1917)
A Rich Man's Plaything (1917)
The Blue Bird (1918)
The Uphill Path (1918)
The Sporting Life (1918)
Under the Greenwood Tree (1918)
Three Men and a Girl (1919)
My Lady's Garter (1919)
The Firing Line (1919)
Sadie Love (1919)
 The Tower of Jewels (1919)
 Youthful Folly (1920)
A Fool and His Money (1920)
The Flapper (1920)
 Nothing But the Truth (1920)
The Wonder Man (1920)
 At the Stage Door (1921)
 A Divorce of Convenience (1921)
 The Last Door (1921)
Back Pay (1922)
 The Blonde Vampire (1922)
Beyond the Rainbow (1922)
 The Madness of Love (1922)
 Marriage Morals (1923)
 One Million in Jewels (1923)
The Truth About Women (1924)
 The Police Patrol (1925)
 Hell-Bent for Frisco (1931)

External links

American male film actors
American male silent film actors
20th-century American male actors
1877 births
1972 deaths